Luis Beristáin (1918–1962) was a Mexican film and television actor.

Selected filmography
 Tragic Wedding (1946)
 Hypocrite (1949)
 The Devil Is a Woman (1950)
 Women's Prison (1951)
 Crime and Punishment (1951)
 The Martyr of Calvary (1952)
 The Plebeian (1953)
 My Mother Is Guilty (1960)

References

Bibliography
 Edwards, Gwynne. A Companion to Luis Buñuel. Tamesis Books, 2005.

External links

1918 births
1962 deaths
Mexican male television actors
Mexican male film actors
Male actors from Mexico City